Fax is a genus of sea snails, marine gastropod mollusks in the superfamily Buccinoidea.

Species
 Fax grandior (Verco, 1908)
 Fax molleri (Iredale, 1931)
 Fax tabidus (Hedley, 1904)
 Fax tenuicostatus (Tenison Woods, 1877)
Synonyms
 Fax alertae Dell, 1956: synonym of Cominella (Eucominia) alertae (Dell, 1956) represented as Cominella alertae (Dell, 1956) (basionym)
 Fax mirabilis (Powell, 1929): synonym of Cominella (Eucominia) mirabilis mirabilis Powell, 1929 represented as Cominella mirabilis mirabilis Powell, 1929
 Fax powelli C. A. Fleming, 1948: synonym of Cominella (Eucominia) mirabilis powelli (C. A. Fleming, 1948) represented as Cominella mirabilis powelli (C. A. Fleming, 1948) (basionym)

References

 Fraussen, K. (2010). Buccinidae checklist. Pers. Com.

Buccinoidea (unassigned)
Gastropod genera